The Defence Evaluation and Research Agency (DERA) was a part of the UK Ministry of Defence (MoD) between 1995 and 2 July 2001. At the time it was the United Kingdom's largest science and technology organisation. It was regarded by its official history as 'a jewel in the crown' of both government and industry.

Formation and operation 
DERA was formed in April 1995 as an amalgamation of: 
Defence Research Agency (DRA) which was set up in April 1991 and comprised 
Royal Aerospace Establishment (RAE)
Admiralty Research Establishment (ARE)
Royal Armament Research and Development Establishment (RARDE)
Royal Signals and Radar Establishment (RSRE)
Defence Test and Evaluation Organisation (DTEO)
Chemical and Biological Defence Establishment (CBDE at Porton Down), which became part of the Protection and Life Sciences Division (PLSD)
Centre for Defence Analysis (CDA).

The chief executive throughout DERA's existence was John Chisholm. DERA's staffing level was around 9,000 scientists, technologists and support staff.

Dissolution 
DERA was split into two organisations, based on short-lived transition bodies known as PDERA ("privatised" DERA) - becoming a commercial firm, QinetiQ - and "RDERA" ( "retained" in Government DERA) - becoming the Defence Science and Technology Laboratory (Dstl).

At the split, QinetiQ was formed from the majority (about 3/4 of the staff and most of the facilities) of DERA, with Dstl assuming responsibility for those aspects which were best done in government. A few examples of the work undertaken by Dstl include nuclear, chemical, and biological research. In the time since the split both organisations have undergone significant change programmes. QinetiQ has increased its focus on overseas research with a number of US and other foreign acquisitions, whereas Dstl has a major rationalisation programme.

References

External links
 The former DERA website (Internet Archive link)
 QinetiQ website
 Dstl website

Government munitions production in the United Kingdom
Evaluation
Government agencies established in 1995
Government agencies disestablished in 2001
2001 disestablishments in the United Kingdom
Defence agencies of the United Kingdom
Defunct executive agencies of the United Kingdom government
1995 establishments in the United Kingdom